O'Day Corp. was a America sailboat builder, located in Fall River, Massachusetts.

History
It was founded in 1958 by George O'Day, the American Olympic and World champion sailor.

George O'Day sold the company to Bangor Punta Corporation in 1966.  Bangor Punta also acquired other boat builders around that time including Cal Yachts and Starcraft Marine.  Bangor Punta was later acquired by Lear Siegler.  O'Day went out of business in 1989.

Boats
O'Day co-designed and built the Day Sailer which was inducted into the American Sailboat Hall of Fame in 2003.  More than 12,000 Day Sailers have been sold.

In 1959 O'Day adapted the Philip Rhodes' Hurricane design to create the Rhodes 19.  Over 3000 Rhodes 19's have been built.  In 1982 Stuart Marine Corp. took over production of the Rhodes 19.

The company built many very popular sailboat designs:

See also
 List of sailboat designers and manufacturers

References

External links

O'Day Corp.